Bob Steele may refer to:

Bob Steele (broadcaster) (1911–2002), American radio personality in Hartford, Connecticut
Bob Steele (actor) (1907–1988), American actor in Westerns
Bob Steele (baseball) (1894–1962), Major League Baseball pitcher
Bob Steele (cricketer) (1901-1985), Australian cricketer

See also
Bobby Steele (born 1956), American musician
Robert Steele (disambiguation)
Robert K. Steel (born 1951), businessman